Paradiso is a Dutch music venue and cultural centre located in Amsterdam.

History

It is housed in a converted former church building that dates from the nineteenth century and that was used until 1965 as the meeting hall for a liberal Dutch religious group known as the "Vrije Gemeente" (Free Congregation).  It is located on de Weteringschans, near the Leidseplein, one of the nightlife and tourism centers of the city. The main concert hall in the former church interior has high ceilings and two balcony rings overlooking the stage area, with three large illuminated church windows above the stage.  The acoustics are rather echoey, but improvements have been made over the years. In addition to the main concert hall, there are two smaller cafe stages, on an upper floor and in the basement.

Paradiso was squatted by hippies in 1967 who wanted to convert the church to an entertainment and leisure club. The police ended the festivities the same year. In 1968, the city opened Paradiso as a publicly subsidized youth entertainment center. Along with the nearby Melkweg (Milky Way), it soon became synonymous with the hippie counterculture and the rock music of that era. It was one of the first locations in which the use and sale of soft drugs was tolerated. From the mid-1970s, Paradiso became increasingly associated with punk and new wave music, although it continued to program a wide variety of artists. Starting in the late 1980s, raves and themed dance parties became frequent.

In 1994, Paradiso, along with the Institute for Sonology and The ArtScience Interfaculty (The Hague), initiated Sonic Acts together. In recent years, the venue has settled into an eclectic range of programming, which, besides rock, can include lectures, plays, classical music, and crossover artists.  Long associated with clouds of tobacco and hashish smoke, Paradiso banned smoking in its public areas in 2008 in accordance with a nationwide ban on smoking in public venues.

The acts

Artists who played at the Paradiso include AC/DC, Adele, Antony & The Johnsons, Arcade Fire, Arctic Monkeys, Arno, Bad Brains, Bad Religion, Balthazar, Beastie Boys, Beck, Big Audio Dynamite, Björk, Blancmange, Blondie, David Bowie, Herman Brood, James Brown, Jeff Buckley, John Cale, Nick Cave and the Bad Seeds, Chemical Brothers, Chic, George Clinton, Coldplay, The Cure, Daft Punk, D'Angelo, Dead Kennedys, Death Grips, Deep Purple, Deftones, dEUS, De Dijk, Doe Maar, Dua Lipa, Candy Dulfer, Duran Duran, Editors, Electrosexual, Eminem, Epica, Faith No More, Fishbone, Fiction Plane, Lady Gaga, Godspeed You! Black Emperor, Golden Earring, Dexter Gordon, Herbert Grönemeyer, Guns N' Roses, Beth Hart, PJ Harvey, Billy Idol, Chris Isaak, Joe Jackson, The Jam, Jamiroquai, Joy Division, Junkie XL, Kaizers Orchestra, Kayak, The Killers, Kraftwerk, Lenny Kravitz, Dayna Kurtz, Fela Kuti, Lamb, Laibach, Live, Living Colour, Loudness, Mano Negra, Madness, Madonna, Dave Matthews, Curtis Mayfield, Metallica, Metropole Orkest, Marcus Miller, Motorpsycho, The Mountain Goats, Muse, Youssou N’Dour, Willie Nelson, The Neville Brothers, Nightwish, Nirvana, NITS, Oasis, Omar & the Howlers, The Only Ones, Pain of Salvation, Pearl Jam, Phish, Pink Floyd, The Police, Iggy Pop, Primus, Prince, The Proclaimers, Psychic TV, Public Enemy, Rage Against the Machine, The Ramones, Red Hot Chili Peppers, R.E.M, The RH Factor, Riverside, The Rolling Stones, The Roots, Run DMC, Soft Machine, The Sex Pistols, Wayne Shorter, Siouxsie and the Banshees, Patti Smith Group, Smoosh, Snarky Puppy, The Sound, Esperanza Spalding, Sting, Ken Stringfellow, Supersister, Talking Heads, Tiësto, Emilíana Torrini, Peter Tosh, Johnny Thunders, Tool, Tower of Power, U2, The Undertones, Urban Dance Squad, Van Halen, Suzanne Vega, Vulfpeck, Westlife, Amy Winehouse, Cory Wong, Link Wray, Dweezil Zappa, Zita Swoon and many more.

On 23 May 1968, Pink Floyd performed a concert at the club venue containing songs from The Piper at the Gates of Dawn and A Saucerful of Secrets. The recording of "Interstellar Overdrive" can be found on the compilation album Cre/ation: The Early Years 1967–1972.

Glen Matlock played his last gig with the Sex Pistols at Paradiso on 7 January 1977 until the reunion in 1996.

The song "Paradiso" by The Chameleons, released in 1986, was named after the venue.

David Bowie played in Paradiso in 1987, 1989 and 1997. The 1989 Tin Machine concert was recorded.

Cardiacs recorded their album Cardiacs Live at Paradiso on 15 May 1988.

On 26–27 May 1995, The Rolling Stones played two semi-acoustic concerts at the Paradiso. Scalped tickets reportedly sold for many thousands of dollars. Recorded tracks from these concerts were released on the Stones' Stripped album later that year. Keith Richards said that the Paradiso concerts were the best live shows the Stones ever did. The first of the two concerts was released in full on DVD in 2016, in the "Totally Stripped" five-disc limited edition.

Phish performed at the venue three times in 1997, one date in February and a two-night stand in July. In 2015, all three concerts were released in their entireties on the 8-CD box set Amsterdam.

Beth Hart’s performance during the recording of the Live at Paradiso DVD on May 7, 2004, resurrected her music career in Europe after declining in the early 2000s due to drug addiction and untreated mental illness in the US.

American rockband Live recorded their album Live at the Paradiso – Amsterdam at the venue in 2008.

Gallery

Future
In the 1990s, the future of Paradiso became something of a political issue in Amsterdam, since there was some political resistance to the continuation of the subsidies that allowed the venue to operate in its central city location. More recently, supporters have successfully argued that the Paradiso subsidy is reasonable in comparison with subsidies given to other performance venues.

References

Further reading
Converted Churches. Tectum Publishers, Antwerp, Belgium 2007, 178–183.

External links

 
Viberate profile

Music venues in the Netherlands
Concert halls in Amsterdam
Rock music venues
Squats in the Netherlands
Legalized squats